History of the Franks may refer to:
The history of the Franks, a confederation of Germanic tribes
Historia Francorum, a book written by Gregory of Tours